Night Stage to Galveston is a 1952 American Western film directed by George Archainbaud and written by Norman S. Hall. The film stars Gene Autry, Virginia Huston, Thurston Hall, Judy Nugent, Robert Livingston and Harry Cording. The film was released on March 18, 1952, by Columbia Pictures.

Plot

Cast
Gene Autry as Gene Autry
Virginia Huston as Ann Bellamy
Thurston Hall as Colonel James Bellamy
Judy Nugent as Cathy Evans
Robert Livingston as Adjutant General Slayden
Harry Cording as Ted Driscoll
Robert Bice as Captain Yancey
Frank Sully as Policeman Kelly
Pat Buttram as Pat Buttram
Champion as Gene's Horse

References

External links
 

1952 films
American Western (genre) films
1952 Western (genre) films
Columbia Pictures films
Films directed by George Archainbaud
American black-and-white films
1950s English-language films
1950s American films